Five-time defending champion Esther Vergeer defeated Aniek van Koot in the final, 6–2, 6–1 to win the women's singles wheelchair tennis title at the 2011 US Open.

Seeds
 Esther Vergeer (champion)
 Jiske Griffioen (semifinals)

Draw

Finals

External links 
 Main Draw

Wheelchair Women's Singles

pl:US Open 2011#Gra pojedyncza kobiet na wózkach